Terry Holladay (born November 28, 1955) is an American former professional tennis player who played between 1974 and 1987, whose tennis career is particularly remembered for her pregnancy and its impact on protected rankings.

Biography
Holladay was born in Charlotte, North Carolina, and grew up in La Jolla, San Diego, California, attending and graduating from La Jolla High School. Following her retirement from tennis, Holladay became a realtor. In 2000, she survived breast cancer. She married Dr. Philip Arthur Higginbottom, with whom she founded the Dina Humanitarian Foundation.

Tennis career
She turned professional in 1974 and regards 1976 as her best year. She represented the United States in the 1976 Wightman Cup, beating Glynis Coles 3–6, 6–1, 6–4 in her only match in this competition. In 1982, she gave birth to a daughter Tasha, and was awarded special entry to six tournaments in 1983 by the WTA introducing a new rule.

She was inducted into the San Diego Tennis Hall of Fame in 2012.

Career results

Grand Slam singles tournament timeline

Singles finals

Doubles finals

References

External links
 
 

1955 births
Living people
American female tennis players
Sportspeople from Charlotte, North Carolina
Tennis players from San Diego
Tennis people from North Carolina
21st-century American women